Paerish (stylised as Pærish), formerly known as Crackity Flynn, is a French alternative rock band based in Paris. The band is composed of Mathias Court (guitar/vocals), Frédéric Wah (guitar), Martin Dupraz (bass), Julien Louvion (drums). Formed in 2010, the band has released two studio albums: Semi Finalists in 2016 and Fixed It All in 2021.

History

2010–2014: Early years and first singles 
The formation of Paerish dates back to 2010 when the band members met in school in Paris. Members Court, Dupraz (bass) and Louvion (drums) – would first meet and form as a trio five years ago in a Paris film school, where Court and Dupraz were studying film production and Louvion sound engineering. The band initially was known as Crackity Flynn but adopted the name Paerish, which was based on the character Alan Parrish in Jumanji.

2015–2018: Semi Finalists 
In 2015, the band began writing and recording music for their first full-length studio album. On 20 July 2015, Paerish released "Undone", the lead single off their debut album, Semi Finalists. The band's second single off the album, "Then People Forget" came out on 19 November 2015.

2019–present: Fixed It All 
In 2019, after being independent of a record label, Paerish signed a contract with SideOneDummy Records ahead of their second studio album, originally anticipating for a released in 2020. The band announced that producer Will Yip would produce their second album, Fixed It All and in August 2020, the self-titled single was released. In an interview with Brooklyn Vegan, Court shared how the album would be more shoegazing-inspired than previous works. Court explained that the album was " much darker, heavier than what we've made in the past both sonically and lyrically. It's about the depression I felt losing one of my best friends and questioning the decisions in my life." Although writing and recording for the album was complete in late 2019 and were aiming for an early 2020 released, the onset of the COVID-19 pandemic, delayed the process of release of the album in 2021.

Fixed It All was eventually released through SideOneDummy on 23 April 2021. When it was released the band discussed about the struggles of breaking into the mainstream by "creating Anglo music as a French band", admitting that much of their audience would be in the United States and United Kingdom. In an interview with Dscvrd magazine, Martin Dupraz explained that "rock [music] isn’t really trendy right now in France." Drummer Julien Louvion further clarified that "We [as a band] always knew that most of our fans wouldn’t be French. French radios play the majority of songs in French, so when you’re a rock band that sings in English, it’s pretty hard”. The album was primarily met with amateur critic reviews that offered generally favorable reviews of the album.

Discography

Studio albums 
 Semi Finalists (2016)
 Fixed It All (2021)

Singles 
 "Marcel and the Prince" (2013)
 "Undone" (2015)
 "Then People Forget" (2015)
 "Party's Over, Biff" (2016)
 "Boy" (2021)

References

External links 
 Official Website

Musical groups established in 2010
French alternative rock groups
French indie rock groups
2010 establishments in France
Musical groups from Paris
SideOneDummy Records artists